The Seven Devils Mountains are notable peaks in the western United States, located in west central Idaho in the Hells Canyon Wilderness.  They are above the east bank of the Snake River, which forms the Idaho-Oregon border.

There are several marked and unmarked trails and cleared camping areas throughout the mountains. It has several waterfalls and streams as well as numerous lakes.

Ecology 
The Seven Devils contains a wide variety of wildlife such as bighorn sheep, mountain goat, mule deer, elk, black bear, cougar, cutthroat and rainbow trout. There are several lakes with high fish populations and there are numerous wild flowers. The Seven Devils has numerous sub-alpine meadows and vast pine forests.

Peaks

References

External links

Mountain ranges of Idaho
Landforms of Idaho County, Idaho